William A. Wittmer Lustron House, also known as the Majorie Hiorth Lustron House, is located in Alpine, Bergen County, New Jersey, United States. The house was built in 1949 and was added to the National Register of Historic Places on July 25, 2000.

See also
National Register of Historic Places listings in Bergen County, New Jersey
Harold Hess Lustron House
List of Lustron houses

References

Alpine, New Jersey
Houses on the National Register of Historic Places in New Jersey
Houses completed in 1949
Houses in Bergen County, New Jersey
Lustron houses
National Register of Historic Places in Bergen County, New Jersey
New Jersey Register of Historic Places